Any Which Way You Can is a 1980 American action comedy film directed by Buddy Van Horn and starring Clint Eastwood, with Sondra Locke, Geoffrey Lewis, William Smith, and Ruth Gordon in supporting roles. The film is the sequel to the 1978 hit comedy  Every Which Way but Loose. The cast of the previous film return as Philo Beddoe (Eastwood) reluctantly comes out of retirement from underground bare-knuckle boxing to take on a champion hired by the mafia, who will stop at nothing to ensure the fight takes place, while the neo-Nazi biker gang Philo humiliated in the previous film also come back for revenge.

Plot

Two years after throwing his fight with Tank Murdock, Philo Beddoe is still fighting in underground bare-knuckle boxing matches to make money on the side. Philo, who still lives with his mother, his brother Orville and orangutan Clyde, decides to retire when he realizes that he has started to enjoy the pain. One evening, Philo encounters his ex-girlfriend, country-western singer Lynn Halsey-Taylor, singing at his favorite bar. Orville angrily reproves Lynn for her actions two years before. Lynn apologizes to Philo. Philo, initially gruff and reluctant, forgives her. They become a couple again and move in together.
 
The Black Widows, the biker gang with a long-running grudge against Philo, return. They still want revenge for the destruction of their bikes. However, Philo bests them in a chase that runs through an asphalt machine during a road-paving project.

Meanwhile, Jack Wilson, a new breed of fighter from the East Coast who mixes martial arts with boxing, dominates the bare-knuckle circuit. He is so effective at maiming his opponents that his handlers cannot book fights for him. After a fight between a mongoose and a rattlesnake, one of the handlers realizes that if Philo, king of the West Coast brawlers, agreed to fight Wilson, it would be the biggest draw in the history of bare-knuckle boxing. Philo initially agrees to the fight but after much prodding from Orville and Lynn, withdraws. The handlers, led by handicapper Jimmy Beekman and backed by the Mafia, kidnap Lynn to coerce Philo to show up for the fight. The fight is to take place near Jackson, Wyoming. The Black Widows follow Philo there.

Wilson, however, is a prize fighter with morals. After he learns of the plot and helps Philo and Orville rescue Lynn, he and Philo mutually decide to call off the fight. However, both fighters' personal pride makes them wonder who would have won. The brawl between the duo takes place after all, but it is punctuated by pauses and personal reflections on their mutual admiration for each other. Meanwhile, the Black Widows bet everything they have on Philo; despite their rivalry, they know that he is the better fighter. When the mobsters try to kill Philo once he gains the upper hand, the Black Widows protect their investment by beating up the Mafia men. Wilson eventually breaks Philo's arm and offers to end the fight, but the two men continue the brawl. After a long fight, Philo knocks Wilson out long enough to qualify for a win. Wilson helps Philo to the hospital, then later on they have a drink at the Million Dollar Cowboy Bar. On their way home, Philo and the Black Widows (who are now rich) declare a truce and part amicably. Beekman, whose attempts to rig the fight for Wilson failed, cannot pay the mob bettors and is marked for death. After reaching California, Philo and Lynn are pulled over by a cop who lost money betting against Philo earlier; he promises to endlessly harass them as punishment. Lynn calls out, "Right turn, Clyde!" Clyde promptly knocks out the cop and they drive away.

Cast
 Clint Eastwood as Philo Beddoe
 Sondra Locke as Lynn Halsey-Taylor
 Geoffrey Lewis as Orville Boggs
 Ruth Gordon as Zenobia 'Ma' Boggs
 William Smith as Jack Wilson
 Barry Corbin as Zack Tupper
 Harry Guardino as James Beekman
 Michael Cavanaugh as Patrick Scarfe
 James Gammon as the bartender 
 John Quade as Cholla
 Al Ruscio as Tony Paoli Sr.
 Jack Murdock as Little Melvin
 George Murdock as Sergeant Cooley
 Dick Durock as Joe Casey
 Julie Brown as Candy
 Dan Vadis as Frank
 Camila Ashlend as Hattie
 Anne Ramsey as Loretta Quince
 Logan Ramsey as Luther Quince
 Jim Stafford as Long John
 Michael Talbott as Officer Morgan
 Mark L. Taylor as Desk Clerk
 Jack Thibeau as Head Muscle
 Charles Walker as Officer

Production
Any Which Way You Can started filming in summer 1980. The film was filmed in the California communities of Sun Valley, North Hollywood, and Bakersfield, and in Jackson, Wyoming.

Glen Campbell performed the "Any Which Way You Can" title song track in the final scene of the movie, and the song was a Top-10 hit on the country music charts.

Manis, the orangutan that played Clyde in the first film, was replaced by two younger orangutans, C.J. and Buddha. Generally, primates are not used as animal actors past the age of 8 because their strength is fully developed and they are often less docile. According to a book by Jane Goodall and Dale Peterson entitled Visions of Caliban, Buddha was badly mistreated and beaten by his trainers, and C.J. was just brought in after filming was completed in order to do the publicity after Buddha's death, possibly from injuries inflicted by the trainers. Doubt has been cast on these claims by makeup effects artist William Munns.

Reception

Box office
Any Which Way You Can opened on Wednesday, December 17, 1980 and became the number one film at the U.S. box office with an opening weekend gross of $8,024,663 from a record 1,541 theatres. The following weekend, between Christmas and New Year, the film stayed at number one, grossing $10,091,105 from 1,572 theatres, a 26% increase. The Saturday was a record single day gross for a Warner Bros.' film with a gross of $3,861,561, beating the record set by Superman.

It was the 5th highest-grossing film of 1980 with a gross of $70,687,344 in the United States and Canada.

Critical response
Roger Ebert gave the film two stars out of four and opened his review by stating: "Clint Eastwood's "Any Which Way You Can" is not a very good movie, but it's hard not to feel a grudging affection for it. Where else, in the space of 115 minutes, can you find a country & western road picture with two fights, a bald motorcycle gang, the Mafia, a love story, a pickup truck, a tow truck, Fats Domino, a foul-mouthed octogenarian, an oversexed orangutan and a contest for the bare knuckle championship of the world?" Janet Maslin of The New York Times thought the film was "better and funnier than its predecessor," adding that "Clyde's role has been expanded this time, and Ruth Gordon's has been made smaller, all of which makes the formula much more fun." Todd McCarthy of Variety wrote, "Filled with plenty of monkey business, first half is pretty funny as these things go, but film runs out of steam after mid-way highlight ... Although overlength didn't stop 'Loose,' same flaw here is even more irritating due to protracted finale and lack of any continuing tension in Eastwood-Locke relationship." Gene Siskel of the Chicago Tribune gave the film three stars out of four and called it "a most genial Eastwood action-comedy." Kevin Thomas of the Los Angeles Times wrote, "Directed in an appropriately laid-back manner by Buddy Van Horn in his directorial debut, 'Any Which Way You Can' aspires to nothing more than entertainment. As one comedy of admittedly greater ambitions after another proves disappointing these days, 'Any Which Way You Can' (PG) is welcome as just plain fun." Gary Arnold of The Washington Post wrote, "A generous entertainment of its kind, 'Any Which Way' mixes plentiful portions of gauche, robust action and comedy with frequent musical interludes ... The weakest element in the plot is the lack of a compelling reason for Philo and Jackson to go through with their fight."

As of December 2019, the film holds a rating of 20% on the review aggregator Rotten Tomatoes based on 10 reviews, with an average rating of 4.92 out of 10.

Soundtrack

Track listing

Chart performance

References

Bibliography

External links
 
 
 

1980 films
1980s action comedy films
1980s buddy comedy films
American action comedy films
American sequel films
American boxing films
American buddy action films
American buddy comedy films
Country music films
1980s English-language films
Films about apes
Films set in California
Films set in Wyoming
Warner Bros. films
Underground fighting films
Mafia comedy films
Trucker films
1980 comedy films
Films directed by Buddy Van Horn
1980 directorial debut films
1980s American films